Shamsi Badal oghlu Badalbeyli (23 February 1911, Shusha – 23 May 1987, Baku) was an Azerbaijani theatre director and actor.

Life and career
Shamsi Badalbeyli was born in Shusha to Badal Badalbeyli, a music teacher, and his wife Rahima. He belongs to a family of Azerbaijani artists, including with his uncle Ahmed Agdamski, older brother Afrasiyab Badalbeyli and son Farhad Badalbeyli.

Shamsi Badalbeyli graduated from high school in Baku and enrolled in the Azerbaijan State Conservatoire in 1927, majoring in Theory of Composition. After graduating in 1932 and doing fieldwork in Moscow's Maly Theatre, he directed Monsieur Jordan and Mastali the Dervish by Mirza Fatali Akhundov at the Azerbaijan State Academic Drama Theatre. He continued to work there until 1942.

Shamsi Badalbeyli directed his first play (Olular by Jalil Mammadguluzadeh) in the early 1940s. Throughout his life he directed 35 pieces. He starred in a number of films, namely Akhirinji ashirim ("The Final Pass"), O Gizi Tapin ("Find That Girl"), and Omrun sahifalari ("Pages of Life").

In 1943–1949, 1956–1961 and 1963–1974, Shamsi Badalbeyli served as a producer of the Azerbaijan Musical Comedy Theatre. In 1974–1976, he fulfilled similar duties at the Azerbaijan State Philharmonic Society. In 1976, he was elected head of the Azerbaijani Theatre Association.

By his wife Leyla Safaraliyeva (1916–2000), he is the father of composer Farhad Badalbeyli.

References

See also
 List of People's Artists of the Azerbaijan SSR

1911 births
1987 deaths
Azerbaijani theatre directors
Azerbaijani male stage actors
People's Artists of Azerbaijan
Soviet Azerbaijani people
20th-century Azerbaijani male actors
Actors from Shusha
Badalbeyli family
Honored Art Workers of the Azerbaijan SSR
Soviet theatre directors
Soviet male actors